The 2005 IIHF World U18 Championships were held in České Budějovice and Plzeň, Czech Republic. The championships began on April 14, 2005 and finished on April 24, 2005. Games were played at Budvar Arena in České Budějovice and ČEZ Aréna in Plzeň. The United States of America defeated Canada 5–1 in the final to claim the gold medal, while the Sweden defeated Czech Republic 4–2 to capture the bronze medal.

Championship results

Preliminary round

Group A

Group B

Relegation round

Note: The following matches from the preliminary round carry forward to the relegation round:
April 15, 2005:  1–3 
April 15, 2005:  3–1

Final round

 beat  for the bronze medal 4–2.
 beat  for 5th place 5–2.

Final standings

Scoring leaders

Goaltending leaders

(Minimum 60 minutes played)

Division I

Division I consisted of two separate tournaments. The Group A tournament was held between 3 and 9 April 2005 in Maribor, Slovenia and the Group B tournament was held between 2 and 8 April 2005 in Sosnowiec, Poland. Belarus and Norway won the Group A and Group B tournaments respectively and gained promotion to the Championship Division for the 2006 IIHF World U18 Championships. While Great Britain finished last in Group A and Italy last in Group B and were both relegated to Division II for 2006.

Final standings

Group A
 — promoted to Championship Division for 2006

 — relegated to Division II for 2006

Group B
 — promoted to Championship Division for 2006

 — relegated to Division II for 2006

Division II

Division II consisted of two separate tournaments. The Group A tournament was held between 14 and 20 March 2005 in Kohtla-Järve, Estonia and the Group B tournament was held between 21 and 27 March 2005 in Bucharest, Romania. South Korea and Hungary won the Group A and Group B tournaments respectively and gained promotion to Division I for the 2006 IIHF World U18 Championships. While South Africa finished last in Group A and Romania last in Group B and were both relegated to Division III for 2006.

Final standings

Group A
 — promoted to Division I for 2006

 Serbia and Montenegro
 — relegated to Division III for 2006

Group B
 — promoted to Division I for 2006

 — relegated to Division III for 2006

Division III

The Division III tournament was held between 7 and 13 March 2005 in Sofia, Bulgaria. Australia and Belgium finished first and second respectively and both gained promotion to Division II for the 2006 IIHF World U18 Championships.

Final standings
 — promoted to Division II for 2006
 — promoted to Division II for 2006

Division III Qualification

The Division III Qualification tournament was held between 18 and 20 February 2005 in Ankara, Turkey. Turkey won the tournament and qualified for the Division III tournament after winning both of their games against Armenia and Bosnia and Herzegovina.

Final standings
 — qualified for the 2005 Division III tournament

References

External links
Official results and statistics from the International Ice Hockey Federation
Championship
Division I – Group A
Division I – Group B
Division II – Group A
Division II – Group B
Division III

 
IIHF World U18 Championships
IIHF World U18 Championships
IIHF World U18 Championships
IIHF World U18 Championships
Youth ice hockey in the Czech Republic
International ice hockey competitions hosted by the Czech Republic
2004–05 in Czech ice hockey
April 2005 sports events in Europe